Sipos or Sipoș may refer to:

Geography
Sipoș, tributary of the river Vâlcele in Covasna County, Romania
Sipoș, tributary of the river Olt in Harghita County, Romania

People
Anna Sipos (born 1908), Hungarian table tennis player
Bence Sipos (born 1994), Hungarian professional footballer
Eleonora Vera Sipos (1900–1988), New Zealand businesswoman, humanitarian, welfare worker
Ferenc Sipos (1932–1997), Hungarian footballer and trainer
George Sipos, Canadian poet and journalist
Hajnalka Sipos, Hungarian football goalkeeper
Lilla Sipos (born 1992), Hungarian footballer
Margit Sipos (born 1908), Hungarian swimmer
Márton Sipos (1900–1926), Hungarian swimmer
Norbert Sipos (born 1981), Hungarian football player
Shaun Sipos (born 1981), Canadian actor
Tamás Sipos (1931–2002), Hungarian writer and sports commentator
Tamás Sipos (footballer) (born 1988), Hungarian football player
Vilmos Sipos (1914–1978), Hungarian football player and manager

See also
Sipo (disambiguation)